Chondrolepis leggei is a species of butterfly in the family Hesperiidae. It is found in the eastern part of the Democratic Republic of the Congo, Uganda and western Kenya.

References

Butterflies described in 1909
Hesperiinae